The Medal for Meritorious Service was a medal awarded by the Republic of Rhodesia to civilians and military personnel.

History
The Medal for Meritorious Service was awarded to civilians (who were usually government workers such as INTAF) for "resource and devotion to duty or exemplary voluntary service to the community.", and awarded to military members (used only for territorial, volunteer and reserve forces) for "resource and devotion to duty."

Description
The medal was a silver circular medal that was 36mm around, with the obverse of the medal had the national coat of arms, and the reverse had the pick from the coat of arms in the centre encircled by the words "For Meritorious Service". The recipient's name would be etched on the rim, and a silver bar would be awarded for a subsequent award. The medal also had two different divisions, a civilian division that would have just a plain orange ribbon, and a military division that would have multi-coloured stripes in the centre.

See also
Orders, decorations, and medals of Rhodesia
Meritorious Conduct Medal

References 

Orders, decorations, and medals of Rhodesia
Rhodesia